H53 may refer to:

 , a Royal Navy D-class destroyer
 Sikorsky H-53, a family of military helicopters
 Washinosu Station, in Yakumo, Hokkaido, Japan
 Seaplane Hangar H53, now Hangar H, in Copenhagen, Denmark